Félix Demaría, also known as Felice Demaria or Felix De Maria (born 27 April 1912) was an Argentine professional footballer, who played as a midfielder or as a defender.

Career
Demaría played for Estudiantes de La Plata in Argentina before moving to Italy to play for Ambrosiana-Inter in Serie A.

His older brother Attilio Demaría played for the national teams of Argentina and Italy. To distinguish them, Attilio was referred to as Demaría I  and Félix as Demaría II.

References

1912 births
Possibly living people
Argentine expatriate footballers
Argentine expatriate sportspeople in Italy
Argentine footballers
Argentine people of Italian descent
Estudiantes de La Plata footballers
Expatriate footballers in Italy
Inter Milan players
Serie A players
Association football midfielders